The black-breasted barbet (Lybius rolleti) is a species of bird in the Lybiidae family.
It is found in Central African Republic, Chad, Sudan, South Sudan, and the extreme northeast of Democratic Republic of Congo and northern Uganda.

It occurs in woodlands of the eastern Sahel, between 200m and 1200m altitude (and as high as 2134m in western Sudan).

Taxonomy

This species is monotypic.

Distribution and habitat

The black-breasted barbet's range is largely in South Sudan. It is however known from Zakouma National Park, where birders do go to search for it.

Behaviour and ecology

This frugivorous barbet is known to frequent fig trees in Zakouma National Park in the dry season. As these riverine areas flood heavily in the wet season, their movements are unknown but they are not presumed to be migratory.

References

black-breasted barbet
Birds of Sub-Saharan Africa
black-breasted barbet
black-breasted barbet
Taxonomy articles created by Polbot
Taxobox binomials not recognized by IUCN